Stories Don't End is the third studio album by American folk-rock band Dawes, released on April 9, 2013.

Critical reception

Stories Don't End has received generally positive reception from most music critics. At Metacritic, they assign a weighted average score out of 100 to ratings and reviews from mainstream critics, the album received a Metascore of 76, based on 12 reviews.

James Christopher Monger of Allmusic alluded to how the release "barely registers upon the first spin (it's easy pop for the millennial generation), but if given the time to percolate, it produces a damn fine cup of coffee." At American Songwriter, Jim Beviglia affirmed that the album "is still a step forward, if only for the moments of off-the-cuff brilliance that result from all the ambitious effort." Consequence of Sound's Henry Hauser called the album "distinctively modern." Jim Farber of the Daily News declared that "there's a sure sense of composition that both recalls a classic era and speaks to any."

At Paste, Ryan Reed portrayed the album as "crisper and more overdubbed, sprawling a tad where the first two albums flowed seamlessly", but did note that this is "their most intricate music to date, full of colorful detours and surprising instrumental flavors". PopMatters' John Bergstrom portends that the release "probably will do nothing to diminish the band's appeal among the faithful", at the same instance, this "may be time to put a few bumps in the road." At Rolling Stone, David Fricke proclaimed this release to be a "quietly gripping, deceptively gleaming record." Bud Scoppa of Uncut evoked that "the sound is glossier, beefier, less wistful" on the release because the change in producers.

Track listing

Chart performance
The album debuted at No. 9 on the Top Rock Albums chart and No. 3 on the Folk Albums chart, selling 13,000 copies in the US in its first week.

Airplay

Personnel
Dawes
Taylor Goldsmith - lead vocals, guitars
Griffin Goldsmith - drums, background vocals, percussion
Wylie Gelber - bass guitar
Tay Strathairn - keyboards, background vocals

References

External links
Dawes official website

2013 albums
Dawes (band) albums
Albums produced by Jacquire King